The Institute of the Franciscan Sisters of the Eucharist (FSE) is a Roman Catholic religious congregation for women. The motherhouse is in Meriden, Connecticut, in the Roman Catholic Archdiocese of Hartford.

History
The Institute of the Franciscan Sisters of the Eucharist was founded by Mother Rosemae Pender, FSE on December 2, 1973, as a result of a period of renewal within the Franciscan Sisters of Perpetual Adoration of La Crosse, Wisconsin which led to a divergence of outlook within that Congregation. Mother Rosemae Pender and Mother Shaun Vergauwen served as Mother General and Vicar General, respectively, from the beginning until 2005. In 2002, the Franciscan Brothers of the Eucharist was founded in Meriden as a complement to the Franciscan Sisters of the Eucharist.

From 1976 to 2004, the religious sisters operated the ferry terminal and store on Shaw Island, part of the San Juan Islands in the state of Washington. As of 2018, the congregation had about eighty members.

Apostolate
Franciscan Life Center, Meriden, Connecticut: provides a variety of services including counseling, education, and youth programs.
Franciscan Home Care and Hospice Care, Meriden, Connecticut: is licensed to provide home health care services including nursing, physical therapy, and home health aides, in almost two dozen Connecticut towns.
 In Oregon, the Sisters operate the Franciscan Montessori Earth School, founded in 1977.

The community has thirteen different centers around the world, including the United States, Jerusalem, Rome and Assisi. The Sisters teach at universities, work in hospitals, operate a school in Bethlehem and work at the Vatican. 

The Franciscan Sisters of the Eucharist share the original founders with the Franciscan Sisters of Perpetual Adoration and the Sisters of St. Francis of Assisi of St. Francis, Wisconsin.

References

External links
Franciscan Sisters of the Eucharist

Congregations of Franciscan sisters
Institutes of consecrated life
Roman Catholic Archdiocese of Hartford
Catholic Church in Connecticut
New Haven County, Connecticut
Christian organizations established in 1973